This is the list of the former Prime ministers of France who were born in Paris.
Jacques Chirac
Laurent Fabius,
 Jacques Chaban-Delmas,
 Michel Debré, 
Félix Gaillard, 
Pierre Mendès-France, 
René Mayer, 
Léon Blum, 
Pierre Étienne Flandin, 
Camille Chautemps, 
André Tardieu, 
Paul Painlevé, 
Frédéric François-Marsal, 
Alexandre Millerand, 
Léon Bourgeois, 
Jean Casimir-Perier, 
Albert de Broglie, 
Ernest Courtot de Cissey, 
Charles Cousin-Montauban, Comte de Palikao, 
Louis Eugène Cavaignac, 
Louis-Mathieu Molé, 
Victor de Broglie, 
Armand-Emmanuel du Plessis, Duc de Richelieu, 
Charles Maurice de Talleyrand

History of Paris
prime ministers
Lists of prime ministers
Politicians from Paris
Lists of prime ministers by place of birth